Thomas Hawley Tuberville (born September 18, 1954) is an American politician and retired college football coach serving as the senior United States senator from Alabama, a seat he has held since 2021. Before entering politics, Tuberville was the head football coach at Auburn University from 1999 to 2008. He was also the head football coach at the University of Mississippi from 1995 to 1998, Texas Tech University from 2010 to 2012, and the University of Cincinnati from 2013 to 2016.

Tuberville won five national Coach of the Year Awards (AP, AFCA, Sporting News, Walter Camp, and Bear Bryant) following Auburn's 13–0 season in 2004, in which Auburn won the Southeastern Conference title and the Sugar Bowl, but was left out of the BCS National Championship Game. He earned his 100th career win in 2007. Tuberville is the only coach in Auburn football history to beat in-state rival Alabama six consecutive times. In 2015, he was the president of the American Football Coaches Association. He worked for ESPN as a color analyst for its college football coverage during 2017.

In his first political campaign, Tuberville won the Republican nomination for the 2020 Senate election in Alabama and defeated Democratic incumbent Doug Jones by over 20 points. Establishing himself as an ally of President Donald Trump, he was among a group of Republican senators who attempted to overturn Democratic president-elect Joe Biden's victory over Trump in the 2020 presidential election. Tuberville became Alabama's senior senator in 2023 when Senator Richard Shelby retired.

Early life and education 
Tuberville was born and raised in Camden, Arkansas, one of three children of Olive Nell (née Chambliss) and Charles R. Tuberville Jr. He graduated from Harmony Grove High School in Camden in 1972. He attended Southern Arkansas University, where he lettered in football as a safety for the Muleriders and played two years on the golf team. He received a B.S. in physical education from SAU in 1976. In 2008, he was inducted into the Southern Arkansas University Sports Hall of Fame and the Arkansas Sports Hall of Fame.

Coaching career

Early career
Tuberville first coached at Hermitage High School in Hermitage, Arkansas. He was an assistant coach at Arkansas State University. He then went through the ranks at the University of Miami, beginning as graduate assistant and ending as defensive coordinator in 1993, winning the national championship three times during his tenure there (1986–1994). In 1994, Tuberville replaced Bob Davie as defensive coordinator under R. C. Slocum at Texas A&M University. The Aggies went 10–0–1 that season.

Ole Miss
Tuberville got his first collegiate head coaching job in 1994 at the University of Mississippi ("Ole Miss"). Despite taking over a Rebels team under severe NCAA scholarship sanctions, he was named the SEC Coach of the Year in 1997 by the AP.

At Ole Miss, Tuberville became involved in the movement to ban Confederate flags from the football stadium by requesting that the students quit waving them during the home football games. "We can't recruit against the Confederate flag", he said. Ole Miss's chancellor ultimately placed a ban on sticks at football games, which effectively banned spectators from waving flags.

During his tenure, Tuberville was known as the "Riverboat Gambler" for his aggressive play-calling, especially on fourth down. His teams went 1-3 versus the Arkansas Razorbacks, and 2-2 versus in-state arch-rival Mississippi State Bulldogs in the annual Egg Bowl game. After the 1998 regular season ended, Tuberville said, "They'll have to carry me out of here in a pine box", in reference to not leaving to coach at another school. Less than a week later, it was announced that he was departing for Auburn.

Auburn
Tuberville left Ole Miss after the 1998 season to take the head coaching job at Auburn University in Alabama. At Auburn, he guided the Tigers to the top of the SEC standings, leading them to an SEC championship and the Western Division title in 2004. Under his direction, the Tigers made eight consecutive bowl appearances, including five New Year's Day bowl berths.

During the 1999 off-season, wide receiver Clifton Robinson was charged with statutory rape of a 15-year-old girl. Robinson was suspended from the team for five months. He pleaded guilty to a misdemeanor charge of contributing to the delinquency of a minor and was sentenced to 200 hours of community service. After the plea deal, Tuberville suspended Robinson for the season opener before allowing him to rejoin the team.

In 2004, Auburn went 13–0, including the SEC title and a win over Virginia Tech in the Sugar Bowl. Tuberville received the Associated Press College Football Coach of the Year Award, the American Football Coaches Association, the National Sportscasters and Sportswriters Association and the Walter Camp Football Foundation.

In 2005, despite losing the entire starting backfield from the unbeaten 2004 team to the first round of the NFL draft, Tuberville led Auburn to a 9–3 record, finishing the regular season with victories over rivals Georgia and Alabama.

Under Tuberville, Auburn had a winning record against its biggest rival, Alabama (7–3), and was tied with its next two most significant rivals, Georgia (5–5) and LSU (5–5). He was also 5-5 versus the Arkansas Razorbacks. He led Auburn to six straight victories over in-state rival Alabama, the longest win streak in this rivalry since 1982, the year Auburn broke Alabama's nine-year winning streak.

Tuberville established himself as one of the best big-game coaches in college football, winning nine of his last 15 games against top-10 opponents since the start of the 2004 season. In 2006, his Tigers beat two top-5 teams who later played in BCS bowls, including eventual BCS Champion Florida. Tuberville had a 5–2 career record versus top-5 teams, including three wins versus Florida. But he developed a reputation for losing games when he clearly had the better team. Examples include a humbling 24-point loss to a 4–5 Alabama team in 2001 and a loss to Vanderbilt—the first time Auburn lost to the Commodores in over 50 years. In fact, after dropping three straight SEC games in 2003, Auburn booster Bobby Lowder and Auburn's president and athletic director contacted then Louisville head coach Bobby Petrino to gauge his interest in taking the Auburn job if Tuberville was fired. The press found out about the meeting, which occurred just before the 2003 Alabama game, and the episode has since been known as JetGate.

Tuberville coached 19 players who were selected in the NFL draft, including four first-round picks in 2004, with several others signing as free agents. He coached eight All-Americans and a Thorpe Award winner (Carlos Rogers). Thirty-four players under Tuberville were named to All-SEC (First Team). Eighteen were named All-SEC freshman. His players were named SEC player of the week 46 times. He also had two SEC players of the year and one SEC Championship game MVP.

Tuberville fired offensive coordinator Tony Franklin on October 8, 2008. After the 2008 season, with a 5–7 record including losses to Vanderbilt, West Virginia, and a final 36–0 loss to Alabama, Tuberville resigned. Auburn athletic director Jay Jacobs said, "To say the least, I was a little shocked. But after three times of asking him would he change his mind, he convinced me that the best thing for him and his family and for this football program was for him to possibly take a year off and take a step back." With his departure, Tuberville was paid a prorated buyout of $5.1 million. The payments included $3 million within 30 days of his resignation date and the remainder within a year.

After his departure from Auburn, during the 2009 football season, Tuberville worked as an analyst for Buster Sports and ESPN, discussing the SEC and the Top 25 on various television shows and podcasts. He also made a cameo appearance in the Academy Award-winning feature film The Blind Side.

Texas Tech

On December 31, 2009, Tuberville expressed interest in becoming head coach of the Texas Tech Red Raiders. The position was left open after the university fired Mike Leach. On January 9, 2010, Tuberville was named head coach and was introduced at a press conference on Sunday, January 10, 2010. On January 1, 2011, Tuberville became the second head coach in Texas Tech football history to win a bowl game in his first season—an accomplishment unmatched since DeWitt Weaver's first season in 1951–52. This was a 45–38 victory over Northwestern in the inaugural TicketCity Bowl.

On January 18, 2011, Texas Tech announced that Tuberville received a one-year contract extension and a $500,000 per year raise. The extension and raise gave Tuberville a $2 million salary through the 2015 season. Tuberville is responsible for the highest-rated recruiting class in Texas Tech history, securing the 18th-ranked recruiting class in 2011 according to Rivals.com and the 14th-ranked class in the country according to Scout.com.

On November 10, 2012, during a game against the Kansas Jayhawks, Tuberville became involved in a dispute with graduate assistant Kevin Oliver. Tuberville appeared to slap him and knocked off both Oliver's hat and his headset. After the game, Tuberville initially explained the incident by stating that he was aiming for Oliver's shirt in an attempt to pull him off the field. Two days later, in his weekly press conference, he apologized, citing his desire to set a better example for his two sons, one of whom was on the team.

Although Tuberville continued to run Leach's wide-open "Air Raid" spread offense, he was never really embraced by a fan base still smarting over Leach's ouster. According to a student on a recruiting trip to Texas Tech, Tuberville departed a recruiting dinner mid-meal and the next day accepted an offer to become Cincinnati's head coach. He left Texas Tech with an overall record of 20–17 and 9–17 in Big 12 conference play.

Cincinnati
On December 8, 2012, Tuberville resigned as head coach at Texas Tech in order to become the 38th head coach at the University of Cincinnati. He signed a $2.2 million contract to coach the team. Cincinnati's athletic director, Whit Babcock, had previously worked with Tuberville at Auburn; the two had been friends for several years. On December 9, a Lubbock Avalanche-Journal article pointed out that Cincinnati is only 30 miles from Guilford, Indiana, home of Tuberville's wife, Suzanne.

In 2013, his first season with Cincinnati, Tuberville led the Bearcats to an overall record of 9–4 and a 6–2 conference record. His 2014 team was also 9–4 overall, but this time earned an American Athletic Conference co-championship by virtue of their 7–1 league mark. Both years also saw bowl losses, in 2013 to the North Carolina Tar Heels and 2014 to the Virginia Tech Hokies.

On December 4, 2016, after a 4–8 season, Tuberville resigned as head coach of Cincinnati. He left Cincinnati with an overall record of 29–22 and 18–14 in AAC conference play.

TS Capital 
After resigning from Auburn in December 2008, Tuberville formed a 50-50 partnership with former Lehman Brothers broker John David Stroud, creating TS Capital Management and TS Capital Partners, where he had an office and helped find investors. In February 2012, seven investors sued Tuberville and Stroud, saying they were defrauded of more than $1.7 million that they invested from 2008 to 2011. Tuberville's attorneys denied the allegations.

In May 2012, Stroud was indicted for fraudulent use of $5.2 million from various Auburn investment companies, including his partnerships with Tuberville; Tuberville was not charged. Tuberville said in court filings that he was also a victim, and had lost $450,000; he settled the investor lawsuit in October 2013 on undisclosed terms. In November 2013, Stroud pleaded guilty and received a 10-year sentence.

Tommy Tuberville Foundation
In 2014, Tuberville founded the Tommy Tuberville Foundation, which aimed to help American veterans. In 2020, the Associated Press reported that tax records showed the foundation gave away only about one-third of the money it raised. Tax filings from the organization have been accused of not reflecting volunteer labor and donated materials used to refurbish veterans' homes.

U.S. Senate

Elections

2020 

In August 2018, Tuberville moved from Florida to Alabama with the intention to run for the U.S. Senate in 2020. In April 2019, he announced he would enter the 2020 Republican primary for the Senate seat held by Democrat Doug Jones. Tuberville's campaign was described as "low-profile,” with few pre-scheduled campaign appearances or press conferences. He closely allied himself with President Donald Trump. Former White House press secretary Sean Spicer was a member of Tuberville's campaign staff.

Tuberville opposes the right to an abortion and favors repealing the Affordable Care Act (Obamacare). He supports Trump's proposal to build a wall on the border with Mexico. Tuberville supports reducing the national debt through cuts to social programs, but opposes cuts to Social Security, Medicare, or Medicaid. He dismisses the science of climate change, saying that the global climate "won't change enough in the next 400 years to affect anybody."

On March 3, 2020, Tuberville received 33.4% of the vote in the Republican primary, ahead of former United States senator and former attorney general Jeff Sessions, who received 31.6%. Because neither candidate won over 50% of the vote, a runoff election ensued.

On March 10, ahead of the runoff election, Trump endorsed Tuberville. Trump had been angered by Sessions's decision to recuse himself from the investigation into Russian interference in the 2016 United States elections when Sessions was U.S. attorney general. In May 2020, Trump called Sessions "slime" for this decision. In campaign ads, Tuberville attacked Sessions for not being "man enough to stand with President Trump when things got tough." In the July 14 runoff, Tuberville defeated Sessions with 60.7% of the vote.

As the Republican nominee, Tuberville was heavily favored to win the election. He was endorsed by the National Right to Life Committee, America's largest anti-abortion organization. On November 3, he defeated Jones with 60.1% of the vote.

In an Alabama Daily News interview after the election, Tuberville said that the European theater of World War II was fought "to free Europe of socialism" and erroneously that the three branches of the U.S. federal government were "the House, the Senate, and the executive." He also said that he was looking forward to raising money from his Senate office, a violation of federal law. Tuberville's comments attracted criticism.

Tenure 
Tuberville was one of six Republican senators to vote against expanding the COVID-19 Hate Crimes Act, which would allow the U.S. Justice Department to review hate crimes related to COVID-19 and establish an online database. In February 2022, Tuberville dismissed "ridiculous" proposals to ban lawmakers from trading stocks. According to Business Insider, Tuberville violated the STOCK Act 132 times in 2021.

In May 2022, Tuberville introduced the Financial Freedom Act of 2022, which would allow for the inclusion of cryptocurrency in individual retirement accounts.

Speaking at a Trump rally in Nevada on October 8, 2022, Tuberville claimed that Democrats are "pro-crime", "want to take over what you've got", and "want  because they think the people that do the crime are owed that". These remarks were widely condemned as inaccurate and racist; for example, the NAACP called them "flat out racist, ignorant and utterly sickening".

Objections to the 2020 U.S. presidential election 
After taking office in January 2021, Tuberville joined a group of Republican senators who announced they would formally object to counting electoral votes won by Democratic president-elect Joe Biden in the 2020 presidential election. The objections were part of a continued effort by Trump and his allies to overturn his defeat in the election.

When the Electoral College count was held on January 6, pro-Trump rioters stormed the Capitol, forcing officials to evacuate their chambers before the count was completed. Trump contacted Tuberville during the riot through the cell phone of Utah senator Mike Lee, whom Trump misdialed. The count resumed that evening once the Capitol was secured.

Tuberville voted in support of an objection to Arizona's electoral votes and an objection to Pennsylvania's electoral votes, both of which were won by Biden. He was one of six Republican senators to support the former objection and one of seven to support the latter; the remainder of the Senate defeated the objections. No further objections to the electoral votes were debated and the count concluded on the morning of January 7, certifying Biden's victory over Trump.

2021 storming of the United States Capitol 
On May 28, 2021, Tuberville voted against creating an independent commission to investigate the 2021 United States Capitol attack.

Dobbs v. Jackson Women's Health Organization
When Dobbs v. Jackson Women's Health Organization came before the Supreme Court in 2022, Tuberville signed an amicus brief supporting the overturning Roe v. Wade and its federal protection of the right to abortion. After Roe v. Wade was overturned in June 2022, Tuberville called it a "victory for life."

Same-sex marriage 
In 2022, Tuberville responded to a question about the Respect for Marriage Act, which would federally codify same-sex marriage, by saying there was "no need for legislating on gay marriage". He also said, "I’m all about live life the way you want to. It’s a free country." He voted against the bill, which passed and was signed into law.

Committee assignments 
On February 1, 2023, Tuberville announced his committee assignments for the 118th Congress.
 Committee on Agriculture, Nutrition, and Forestry
Subcommittee on Commodities, Risk Management, and Trade
Subcommittee on Rural Development and Energy (Ranking Member)
Subcommittee on Food and Nutrition, Specialty Crops, Organics, and Research
 Committee on Armed Services
Subcommittee on Readiness and Management Support
Subcommittee on Seapower
Subcommittee on Strategic Forces
Committee on Health, Education, Labor and Pensions
Subcommittee on Children and Families (Ranking Member)
Subcommittee on Employment and Workplace Safety
Committee on Veterans' Affairs

Personal life 
Tuberville married Vicki Lynn Harris, also from Camden, Arkansas, and a graduate of Harmony Grove High School, on December 19, 1976. They later divorced. In 1991, Tuberville married Suzanne (née Fette) of Guilford, Indiana; they have two sons.

Tuberville invested $1.9 million in GLC Enterprises, which the Securities and Exchange Commission called an $80 million Ponzi scheme. He lost about $150,000 when the business closed in 2011.

During his time at Auburn, Tuberville participated actively in the Auburn Church of Christ.

Tuberville's interests include "NASCAR, golf, football, hunting and fishing, [and] America's military". He enjoys country and western music.

Head coaching record

<small>* Bowl game coached by David Cutcliffe<small>

<small>* Bowl game coached by Chris Thomsen<small>

Electoral history

Notes

References

External links

 Tommy Tuberville official U.S. Senate website
 Tommy Tuberville for Senate campaign website
 Texas Tech profile (archived)
 
 

|-

 
|-

|-

1954 births
21st-century American politicians
Alabama Republicans
American color commentators
American football safeties
American members of the Churches of Christ
Arkansas State Red Wolves football coaches
Auburn Tigers football coaches
Cincinnati Bearcats football coaches
College football announcers
Coaches of American football from Arkansas
High school football coaches in Arkansas
Living people
Miami Hurricanes football coaches
Ole Miss Rebels football coaches
People from Camden, Arkansas
Players of American football from Arkansas
Republican Party United States senators from Alabama
Southern Arkansas Muleriders football players
Texas A&M Aggies football coaches
Texas Tech Red Raiders football coaches